T. Littleton Hanway ( – January 17, 1921) was an American politician and merchant from Maryland. He served as a member of the Maryland House of Delegates, representing Harford County from 1896 to 1900.

Early life
T. Littleton Hanway was born around 1846 at Hall's Cross Roads in Aberdeen, Maryland, to Sarah (née Keen) and Thomas Hanway.

Career
Hanway was a merchant. He began his mercantile work in Wilmington and Philadelphia. He began his merchant career in Aberdeen in 1870. His mercantile career in Aberdeen concluded on February 6, 1918, with a fire. At that time, Hanway owned a general store with J. Harry Gibson called Hanway & Gibson, but it was destroyed in the fire. Later that year, Hanway sued Philadelphia, Baltimore and Washington Railroad for running over the fire department's water hose being used to quench the fire.

Hanway was a Democrat. He served as postmaster of Aberdeen during President Grover Cleveland's first administration. He served as a member of the Maryland House of Delegates, representing Harford County from 1896 to 1900. Hanway ran for the Democratic nomination for the Maryland Senate in 1901 and 1905.

Hanway served as vice president of the Aberdeen First National Bank and secretary of the Aberdeen Land and Improvement Company. He was a director of the Aberdeen Can Company.

Personal life
Hanway married Elizabeth Morgan in 1875. They had two sons and one daughter, Stanley M., Thomas and Lillian Rouse. Hanway was a member and trustee of Grove Presbyterian Church.

Hanway died on January 17, 1921, at his home in Aberdeen. He was buried at Grove Cemetery.

References

Year of birth uncertain
1840s births
1921 deaths
People from Aberdeen, Maryland
Democratic Party members of the Maryland House of Delegates
Maryland postmasters
Presbyterians from Maryland
19th-century American merchants
19th-century American politicians